The 2016 Formula Masters China season is the sixth season of the Formula Pilota China series, and the third under the Formula Masters China branding. The championship began on 21 May at Shanghai in China and will finish on 16 October at Penbay in Taiwan after fifteen races held at five meetings.

Teams and drivers

Race calendar and results
A provisional race calendar was released on 3 March 2016. An updated race calendar was released on 1 June 2016, which cancelled the round at Kuala Lumpur City Grand Prix. It was announced on 22 July that the Kuala Lumpur round will be replaced by a round at Sepang for the same weekend. After that round in Korea International Circuit was also changed by Sepang Circuit.

Championship standings

Scoring system

Points for are awarded as follows:

Drivers' championship

References

External links
 

Formula Masters China seasons
Formula Masters China season
Formula Masters China season
Masters China